The 1912–13 Navy Midshipmen men's basketball team represented the United States Naval Academy in intercollegiate basketball during the 1912–13 season. The team finished the season with a 9–0 record and was retroactively named the 1912–13 national champion by the Helms Athletic Foundation and the Premo-Porretta Power Poll. It was head coach Louis Wenzell's first and only season coaching the team. Player Laurence Wild was named a consensus All-American at the end of the season.

Schedule

|-
!colspan=9 style="background:#00005D; color:#D4AF37;"| Regular season

Source

References

Navy Midshipmen men's basketball seasons
Navy
NCAA Division I men's basketball tournament championship seasons
Navy Midshipmen Men's Basketball Team
Navy Midshipmen Men's Basketball Team